Anthony Frank Sabatini (born October 20, 1988) is an American attorney and far-right politician who served as a member of the Florida House of Representatives from the 32nd district from 2018 to 2022. He was a candidate in the 2022 United States House of Representatives elections in Florida for Florida's 7th congressional district, losing the Republican primary to Cory Mills.

Early life and education 
Sabatini was born in Smithtown, New York, in 1988 and moved with his family to Florida the following year. In a high school photo, Sabatini and a friend were pictured in blackface. In his freshman year of college, he was photographed in brownface. He earned bachelor's degrees in philosophy and history from the University of Florida in 2012 and a Juris Doctor from the University of Florida Fredric G. Levin College of Law in 2017.

Career 
Sabatini is an infantry officer in the Florida Army National Guard. He was appointed to the City of Eustis Code Enforcement Board and later elected to the Eustis City Commission in 2016 and resigned from the office on April 30, 2018, to focus on his campaign for the Florida House of Representatives. In December 2022, Sabatini was elected Chair of the Lake County Republican party.

Florida House of Representatives 
Sabatini defeated Monica Wofford and Shannon Elswick, to win the August 28, 2018 Republican primary, winning 46.7% of the vote. In the November 6, 2018 general election, Sabatini defeated Democrat Cynthia Brown, taking 56.48% of the vote.

In 2019, Sabatini proposed amendments to make The Swamp Restaurant in Gainesville a landmark to protect it from demolition. The restaurant was temporarily closed, but not demolished, and eventually returned.

On January 13, 2020, Sabatini introduced HB 1365, which would have made it a felony for doctors to provide hormone therapy or gender reassignment surgery for transgender minors.

In 2020, Sabatini introduced legislation allowing Floridians with valid concealed carry licensed to carry firearms on public colleges and universities.

Sabatini has sponsored legislation to enshrine eight-year term limits for Florida's school boards.

Sabatini has introduced legislation to ban red light cameras in Florida.

2022 U.S. House campaign 

On March 8, 2021, Sabatini announced that he would challenge incumbent Republican Representative Daniel Webster for Florida's 11th congressional district. He later suggested he might not wind up running against Webster due to redistricting. On June 7, 2021, he announced he would challenge incumbent Democratic Representative Stephanie Murphy for Florida's 7th congressional district due to redistricting.

Sabatini lost the 2022 Republican primary to Cory Mills in August 2022.

Political positions

Gun rights 
Sabatini has supported Constitutional carry legislation to allow Floridians to carry concealed firearms without first acquiring a permit. Sabatini described permit requirements as a requirement for persons "to beg government permission and pay money for the exercise of their fundamental God-given right." Sabatini introduced Constitutional carry legislation in 2020, 2021, and 2022; the legislation was endorsed by Republican Governor Ron DeSantis but did not pass the Republican-controlled legislature; Sabatini criticized several fellow Republicans for failing to back the bill.

Black Lives Matter protests 
In response to the protests following the murder of George Floyd, Sabatini posted a tweet that suggested that protesters who unlawfully enter businesses would be met with an AR-15 rifle; he posted a similar suggestion on his Facebook page with the caption "Don't Tread on Me". The sentiment was widely condemned, with Florida State Representative Cindy Polo deriding it as "clearly inflammatory" and "inciting violence". Nikki Fried, Florida Agriculture Commissioner, called for Sabatini to be reprimanded. House Speaker José Oliva found no "direct or preemptive threat" in Sabatini's comments and did not take punitive actions. Sabatini also drew criticism from Florida State Senator Shevrin Jones for referring to Black Lives Matter protesters in Minneapolis as "disgusting, lawless thugs" in a tweet calling for their arrest, prosecution, and imprisonment.

"Cancel culture" and the media 
Sabatini has made multiple critical statements of "cancel culture", tweeting that, "If Socrates was out philosophizing in American society today, he would be cancelled real quick". He has called for repealing Section 230 of the Communications Decency Act, arguing that it allows online platforms to remove conservative perspectives.

COVID-19 
In July 2020, a Florida resident filed an ethics complaint against Sabatini in connection with his involvement in several mask mandate lawsuits. The complaint was in response to a press release about the lawsuit that printed Sabatini's official House email address as the press contact and alleged that this violates a Florida State Statute about misuse of public position.

Sabatini has filed at least 14 lawsuits during the COVID-19 pandemic challenging local ordinances requiring the use of face coverings. On September 2, 2020, he received his sixth loss from the filed suits that have so far been heard.

Donald Trump 
Sabatini has proposed renaming the Florida section of U.S. Route 27 the "President Donald J. Trump Highway". During Trump's reelection bid announcement in Orlando on June 18, 2019, a rally goer attacked an Orlando Sentinel reporter filming the event. The reporter tweeted the encounter, to which Sabatini replied "MAGA". for which he was again criticized for supporting violence.

Sabatini has repeatedly supported Republican attempts to overturn the 2020 presidential election, which Trump lost to Democrat Joe Biden. He has repeated disproven conspiracy theories about the election, and has called for audits of the results in Hillsborough County, Miami-Dade County, Broward County, Palm Beach County, and Orange County.

Following the FBI's August 2022 search of Mar-a-Lago, Sabatini said Florida should "sever all ties with DOJ immediately" and added that "any FBI agent conducting law enforcement functions outside the purview of our State should be arrested upon sight".

Supreme Court 
Sabatini criticized President Joe Biden's pledge to nominate a Black woman to the U.S. Supreme Court following Justice Stephen Breyer's announcement that he would retire, tweeting, "Biden MUST be impeached for his anti-white racist exclusion of any white nominee to the Supreme Court".

Francisco Franco 
In 2022, Sabatini quoted Spanish dictator Francisco Franco on Twitter, tweeting that “I answer only to God and to History.” In response to criticism of Sabatini's tweet, Sabatini posted a picture of Franco with President Dwight Eisenhower and stated that critics of his tweet were "extremely un-American."

Electoral history

See also 
 Michelle Salzman
 Cory Mills

References

External links 
 Campaign website
Florida House of Representatives – Anthony Sabatini

1988 births
21st-century American politicians
American critics of Islam
Candidates in the 2022 United States House of Representatives elections
Critics of Islamism
Discrimination against LGBT people in the United States
Far-right politicians in the United States
Florida National Guard personnel
Living people
Sabatini, Anthony
People from Smithtown, New York
University of Florida alumni